Graeme John Miller (born 20 November 1960) is a former New Zealand racing cyclist from Blenheim. He competed at three Olympic Games in 1984, 1988 and 1992. His best result was in 1988 in Seoul where he finished 8th in the men's road race.

He won two gold medals at the 1990 Commonwealth Games in the men's road race and in the men's team time trial. At the 1986 Commonwealth Games he won a silver medal in the men's team time trial, and four years earlier at the 1982 Commonwealth Games he won another silver in the team pursuit over 4000m.

He was the New Zealand team captain and opening ceremony flag bearer at the 1998 Commonwealth Games.

After more than 20 years as a New Zealand representative cyclist, at the age of 42 he retired from competitive cycling due to a back problem.

After four back operations and a two level fusion, Graeme was able to ride again after a six-year layoff.

He came out of retirement in Bermuda in 2008 after being asked to coach a start up team of amateur cyclists. He has won several races since his return to cycling, including the Sinclair Packwood Memorial Road Race in May 2009.

Major results

1987
1st  Road race, National Road Championships
1988
8th Road race, Olympic Games
1993 
1st Stage 4 Herald Sun Tour
3rd US Pro Championship
1995 
1st Stage 11 Herald Sun Tour
1998
1st Stage 10b & 11 Herald Sun Tour
1999
1st Stage 6 Tour Down Under
1st Stage 4 Tour of Japan
2nd Road race, National Road Championships
2000
1st Stage 4 Tour of Japan
2001
1st Stage 2 Tour of Japan
6th First Union Classic

References

External links
 

1960 births
Living people
New Zealand male cyclists
Olympic cyclists of New Zealand
Cyclists at the 1984 Summer Olympics
Cyclists at the 1988 Summer Olympics
Cyclists at the 1992 Summer Olympics
Commonwealth Games gold medallists for New Zealand
Commonwealth Games silver medallists for New Zealand
Cyclists at the 1982 Commonwealth Games
Cyclists at the 1986 Commonwealth Games
Cyclists at the 1990 Commonwealth Games
Cyclists at the 1994 Commonwealth Games
Cyclists at the 1998 Commonwealth Games
New Zealand track cyclists
Sportspeople from Blenheim, New Zealand
People educated at Marlborough Boys' College
Commonwealth Games medallists in cycling
20th-century New Zealand people
Medallists at the 1982 Commonwealth Games
Medallists at the 1986 Commonwealth Games
Medallists at the 1990 Commonwealth Games